The 1990 UCLA Bruins men's soccer team represented the University of California, Los Angeles during the 1990 NCAA Division I men's soccer season. UCLA was coached by then-11th year head coach, Sigi Schmid.

The season is hallmarked by the Bruins winning their second NCAA national championship, and their first since the 1985 team. UCLA finished the season with a 19–1–4 record. UCLA and Rutgers played for the National Championship. In a scoreless draw, the Bruins won 4–3 on a penalties.

Background 

The previous season saw the Bruins finish with a 18–4–1 overall record, competing as an independent. The Bruins earned an at-large bid into the 1989 NCAA Division I Men's Soccer Tournament, where they reached the quarterfinals, before losing to eventual national co-champions, Santa Clara.

Team

Roster 
Source:

Competitions

Regular season

NCAA Tournament

References

External links 
 1990 UCLA Team

1990
1990 in sports in California
NCAA Division I Men's Soccer Tournament-winning seasons
NCAA Division I Men's Soccer Tournament College Cup seasons